Pedro Capó (born 14 November 1980) is a Puerto Rican singer who is a grandson of Puerto Rican singer Bobby Capó and former Miss Puerto Rico Irma Nydia Vázquez. He studied at Colegio Calasanz in Río Piedras, Puerto Rico.

Biography
Pedro picked up the guitar at an early age and quickly became proficient in the instrument, later playing guitar in and becoming the main voice of the group Marka Registrada.

Pedro resided in New York, where he starred in musical productions including: Apollo Theatre's production of The Sweet Spot (New York City) and the Off-Broadway hit musical production of CELIA: The Life and Music of Celia Cruz. He has also starred in the films Shut Up And Do It and Paraiso Travel, which is directed by Simón Brand and co-stars John Leguizamo.

In 2009, he performed a duet with popular Mexican singer Thalía called "Estoy Enamorado" from her new album Primera Fila and another duet with the Puerto Rican singer Kany García called "Si Tú Me Lo Pides".

In 2017, Capó joined multiple artists such as Jennifer Lopez, Gloria Estefan, and Rita Moreno on Lin-Manuel Miranda's "Almost Like Praying". All proceeds from the song benefited the Hispanic Federation and its efforts to help those in Puerto Rico affected by Hurricane Maria.

In 2018, after much time in the acting industry, Capó returned to music with a single called "Calma". After Farruko joined him for the remix, the music video became a huge success with more than 2.5 billion views on YouTube as of May 2022. The singer was also awarded his first Latin Grammy Award for Best Long Form Music Video for "Pedro Capó: En Letra de Otro".

Discography

 Fuego y Amor (2007)
 Pedro Capó (2009)
 Aquila (2014)
 En Letra de Otro (2017)
 Munay (2020)

Awards

Capó has won two ASCAP Awards, for "Fiebre de Amor" (2013) and "La Mordidita" (2016). He is also a Latin Grammy Award winner in the category of Best Long Form Music Video for "Pedro Capó: En Letra de Otro".

Latin Grammy Awards

References

External links

1980 births
Living people
Colegio San José alumni
Latin Grammy Award winners
Latin music songwriters
Latin pop singers
People from San Juan, Puerto Rico
Puerto Rican singer-songwriters
Sony Music Latin artists
21st-century American singers